GJ 357 (also designated Gliese 357) is an M-type main sequence star with an unusually low starspot activity. It is located 31 light-years from the Solar System. The system is part of the Hydra constellation.

Planetary system
The star has three confirmed exoplanets in its orbit, one of which, Gliese 357 d, is considered to be a "super-Earth" within the circumstellar habitable zone.

Planets b and c are close to 3:7 mean-motion resonance. Presuming resonance chain crosses gap to outermost and cold super-terrestrial d and the resonances are simple, GJ 357 may have much more suitable planet for life at approx. 27.5 day period and almost Earth's flux, and (less likely) Mars-sized planet in 2:1 period ratio with GJ 357 c and 2:3 ratio with hypothetical HZ rocky one.

References  

Planetary systems with three confirmed planets
M-type main-sequence stars
0357
Hydra (constellation)
047103
562